Kerem Şener (born 2003) is a Turkish male artistic gymnast and part of the national team. He is a member of Şavkar Gymnastics Sport Club in İzmir.

Şener won the gold medal in the Parallel bars event  in the JU16 division of the 4th Mediterranean Gymnastics Championship held in Athens, Greece on 27-29 September 2019. He became gold medalist with his teammates Bora Tarhan, Tamer Aguş and Hasan Bulut at the  2019 International Junior Team Cup held in Berlin, Germany on 5-6 April. He participated at the 2019 Junior World Artistic Gymnastics Championships in Győr, Hungary on 27-30 June 2019.

At the 2022 European Men's Artistic Gymnastics Championships in Munich, Germany on 18-21 August, he shared the bronze medal in the Team event with his teammates Ferhat Arıcan, Ahmet Önder, Adem Asil and Mehmet Ayberk Koşak.

References

External links

2003 births
Living people
People from Konak
Sportspeople from İzmir
Turkish male artistic gymnasts
21st-century Turkish people